Dayak may refer to:

 Dayak people, an ethnic group native to the interior of Borneo island in Indonesia and Malaysia
 Dayak language
 Land Dayak languages
 A creature in the science fiction film Immortal (2004 film)
 Troy Dayak (born 1971),  American soccer player
 Mano Dayak (1949-1995),  Tuareg freedom fighter, leader, and negotiator

See also
 Dyak (disambiguation)

Language and nationality disambiguation pages